Henry Jackson (20 December 1877 – 2 September 1964) was an  Australian rules footballer who played with St Kilda in the Victorian Football League (VFL).

References

External links 

1877 births
1964 deaths
Australian rules footballers from Victoria (Australia)
St Kilda Football Club players